The Remington–Lee is a bolt-action, box magazine repeating rifle designed principally by James Paris Lee.

Description
It first appeared in 1879, manufactured by the Sharps Rifle Manufacturing Company. Eventually Remington took over production and produced copies in .45-70. Arguably the most modern rifle in the world until the introduction of the 8mm Lebel M1886 rifle using smokeless powder, the Lee utilized the first successful detachable box magazine, unlike the Lebel which still used a tube magazine.

The design was incorporated by the British into the Lee–Metford and Lee–Enfield rifles, thereby becoming one of the most widely used rifle designs of the 20th century. Remington's version of the Model 1879 saw only limited use by the U.S. Navy and the Model 1882 was tested by U.S. Army and issued on a very limited scale. Ultimately, it was passed up in favor of the Krag–Jørgensen in 1892.

In 1884 China acquired 13,000 Remington-Lees chambered in .43 Spanish (11.15×58mmR). Of these, 4,000 were M1882s rechambered for the .43 caliber. During the Sino-French War they proved to be highly effective against the French Army, which predominantly used the single-shot Gras rifle.

New Zealand purchased 500 for its militia in 1887, also chambered in .43 Spanish. These were quickly replaced after complaints about ammunition quality.

Users
 : Purchased 2,000 Remington-Lee rifles of unknown model in 1891 in .43 Spanish, most likely M1885.
 : Between 1884 and 1896, Model 1882 Remington-Lee rifles in .43 Spanish were purchased from the New York firm of Schuyler, Hartley & Graham and issued to the Haitian army, gendarmerie and private militias.
 :Bought 500 M1879 Remington-Lee rifles in 1884 in .43 Spanish from Schuyler, Hartley & Graham
 : Used the M1882 Remington-Lee in .45-70 Government.
 : Purchased 500 M1885 Remington–Lee rifles in 1887 in .43 Spanish for the New Zealand Militia.
 : Purchased 4,000 M1882 Remington-Lee rifles in 1884 in .43 Spanish.
 : Purchased 1,000 M1879 for the US Navy, 750 M1882 for the US Army, and 3,400 M1885 for the US Navy, all in .45-70 Government.

Sources 

.45-70 Rifles by Jack Behn. C1958 by Stackpole Publishing.
Small Arms of the World by WHB Smith and Joseph Smith.

Bolt-action rifles of the United States
Remington Arms firearms
Military equipment of New Zealand
Early rifles
Guns of the American West